Chad Laprise (born July 23, 1986) is a retired Canadian professional mixed martial artist who competed for the UFC in the Welterweight division. A professional competitor since 2010, Laprise won The Ultimate Fighter Nations: Canada vs. Australia, and has also formerly competed for Bellator MMA.

Mixed martial arts career

Early career
Laprise began his professional MMA career in June 2010 in his native Canada. In his first year fighting, he amassed a record of 4-0, with all of the wins coming via TKO in the first round.

Bellator MMA
Laprise fought for the Bellator MMA promotion twice in 2012. He defeated Josh Taveirne by submission in the first round at Bellator 64 in April and then returned to defeat Ainsley Robinson by decision at Bellator 76 in October.

The Ultimate Fighter: Nations
In December 2013, it was announced that Laprise would be a cast member on The Ultimate Fighter Nations: Canada vs. Australia, representing Canada at welterweight. On the show, Laprise first defeated Chris Indich via decision and Kajan Johnson via second round knockout. Laprise won the show by defeating Olivier Aubin-Mercier by split decision at The Ultimate Fighter Nations Finale. He was also the recipient of bonus awards for Fight of the Season and Performance of the Season.

Ultimate Fighting Championship
Laprise faced Yosdenis Cedeno in a lightweight bout on October 4, 2014 at UFC Fight Night 54. He won the fight via unanimous decision.

Laprise next faced Bryan Barberena on April 25, 2015 at UFC 186. Laprise won the fight by unanimous decision. The win also earned Laprise his first Fight of the Night bonus award.

Laprise faced Francisco Trinaldo on August 23, 2015 at UFC Fight Night 74. Laprise lost the fight via TKO in the first round.

Laprise was expected to face Alan Patrick on March 20, 2016 at UFC Fight Night 85. However, Laprise faced Ross Pearson at the event after Pearson's initial opponent Abel Trujillo was removed from their fight due to alleged visa issues restricting his travel to Australia. Patrick remained on the card against promotional newcomer Damien Brown. Laprise lost the fight via split decision.

Laprise faced Thibault Gouti on August 27, 2016 at UFC on Fox 21. Laprise missed weight for the fight, coming in four pounds heavy. He won the fight via TKO in the first round.

Laprise was expected to face Li Jingliang in a welterweight bout on December 10, 2016 at UFC 206. However, Laprise pulled out of the fight on November 16 citing an undisclosed injury.

Laprise faced Brian Camozzi on July 8, 2017 at UFC 213. He won the fight via TKO in the third round. He also earned the Performance of the Night award for the win.

Laprise faced Galore Bofando on December 16, 2017 at UFC on Fox: Lawler vs. dos Anjos. He won the fight via technical knock out in the first round.

Laprise faced Vicente Luque on May 19, 2018 at UFC Fight Night 129. He lost the fight via knockout in the first round.

Laprise faced Dhiego Lima on December 8, 2018 at UFC 231. He lost the fight via knockout in the first round.

In March 2020, Laprise was released by the UFC.

Championships and awards
 Ultimate Fighting Championship
 The Ultimate Fighter Nations: Canada vs. Australia Fight of the Season
 The Ultimate Fighter Nations: Canada vs. Australia Performance of the Season
 The Ultimate Fighter Nations Welterweight Tournament Winner
 Fight of the Night (One time) vs. Bryan Barberena
 Performance of the Night (One time) vs. Brian Camozzi

Mixed martial arts record

|-
|Loss
|align=center|13–4
|Dhiego Lima
|KO (punch)
|UFC 231
|
|align=center|1
|align=center|1:37
|Toronto, Ontario, Canada
|
|-
|Loss
|align=center|13–3
|Vicente Luque
|KO (punches)
|UFC Fight Night: Maia vs. Usman
|
|align=center|1
|align=center|4:16
|Santiago, Chile
|
|-
|Win
|align=center|13–2
|Galore Bofando
|TKO (punches)
|UFC on Fox: Lawler vs. dos Anjos 
|
|align=center|1
|align=center|4:10
|Winnipeg, Manitoba, Canada
|
|-
|Win
|align=center|12–2
|Brian Camozzi
|TKO (punches)
|UFC 213
|
|align=center|3
|align=center|1:27
|Las Vegas, Nevada, United States
|
|-
|Win
|align=center|11–2
|Thibault Gouti
|TKO (punches)
|UFC on Fox: Maia vs. Condit
|
|align=center|1
|align=center|1:36
|Vancouver, British Columbia, Canada
|
|-
|Loss
|align=center|10–2
|Ross Pearson
|Decision (split)
|UFC Fight Night: Hunt vs. Mir
|
|align=center|3
|align=center|5:00
|Brisbane, Australia
|
|-
|Loss
|align=center|10–1
|Francisco Trinaldo
|TKO (punches)
|UFC Fight Night: Holloway vs. Oliveira
|
|align=center|1
|align=center|2:43
|Saskatoon, Saskatchewan, Canada
|
|-
|Win
|align=center|10–0
|Bryan Barberena
|Decision (unanimous)
|UFC 186
|
|align=center|3
|align=center|5:00
|Montreal, Quebec, Canada
|
|-
|Win
|align=center|9–0
|Yosdenis Cedeno
|Decision (unanimous)
|UFC Fight Night: MacDonald vs. Saffiedine
|
|align=center|3
|align=center|5:00
|Halifax, Nova Scotia, Canada
|
|-
|Win
|align=center|8–0
|Olivier Aubin-Mercier
|Decision (split)
|The Ultimate Fighter Nations Finale: Bisping vs. Kennedy
|
|align=center|3
|align=center|5:00
|Quebec City, Quebec, Canada
|
|-
|Win
|align=center|7–0
|Derek Boyle
|Decision (unanimous)
|XFFC 2: East vs. West
|
|align=center|3
|align=center|5:00
|Grand Prairie, Alberta, Canada
|
|-
|Win
|align=center|6–0
|Ainsley Robinson
|Decision (unanimous)
|Bellator 76
|
|align=center|3
|align=center|5:00
|Windsor, Ontario, Canada
|
|-
|Win
|align=center|5–0
|Josh Taveirne
|Submission (triangle choke)
|Bellator 64
|
|align=center|1
|align=center|2:48
|Windsor, Ontario, Canada
|
|-
|Win
|align=center|4–0
|Andrew McInnes
|TKO (punches)
|PFC 1: Border Wars
|
|align=center|1
|align=center|2:29
|Windsor, Ontario, Canada
|
|-
|Win
|align=center|3–0
|James Barber
|TKO (punches)
|XCC 64: Battle at the Border 10
|
|align=center|1
|align=center|1:08
|Walpole Island, Ontario, Canada
|
|-
|Win
|align=center|2–0
|Simonie Joannie
|TKO (punches)
|Fighting Spirit MMA 12: Furious
|
|align=center|1
|align=center|N/A
|London, Ontario, Canada
|
|-
|Win
|align=center|1–0
|James Barber
|TKO (punches)
|Fighting Spirit MMA: Meltdown
|
|align=center|1
|align=center|N/A
|London, Ontario, Canada
|
|-

Mixed martial arts exhibition record

|-
|Win
|align=center|2–0
|Kajan Johnson
|KO (punch)
|rowspan=2|The Ultimate Fighter Nations: Canada vs. Australia
|March 19, 2014 (airdate)
|align=center|2
|align=center|N/A
|rowspan=2|Quebec City, Quebec, Canada
|
|-
|Win
|align=center|1–0
|Chris Indich
|Decision (unanimous)
|January 29, 2014 (airdate)
|align=center|2
|align=center|5:00
|

See also
 List of male mixed martial artists
 List of Canadian UFC fighters

References

External links
 
 

1986 births
Living people
Canadian male mixed martial artists
Sportspeople from Chatham-Kent
Welterweight mixed martial artists
Ultimate Fighting Championship male fighters
Canadian practitioners of Brazilian jiu-jitsu